Villain hitting, da siu yan, demon exorcising, or petty person beating, is a folk sorcery popular in the Guangdong area of China and Hong Kong—primarily associated with Cantonese. Its purpose is to curse one's enemies using magic. Villain hitting is often considered a humble career, and the ceremony is often performed by older ladies, though some shops sell "DIY" kits.

Villain hitting has been preliminarily included in the list of "intangible cultural heritage" by the Hong Kong Home Affairs Bureau, and was selected as "Best Way to Get It Off Your Chest" in TIME magazine's 2009 "Best of Asia" feature.

Villain 
The concept of "villain" is divided into two types: specific villain and general villain.

Specific Villain 
Specific villains are individuals cursed by the villain hitter due to the hatred of their enemies who employ the hitter. A villain could be a famous person hated by the public such as a politician or could be personally known to their enemy, such as when the request is to curse a love rival.

General Villain 
Villain hitters may help their clients curse a general villain: a group of people potentially harmful to the clients.

Dualism is mainstream in the traditional Chinese world view, and many different kinds of folk sorcery beliefs derive from this view. The concept of Villain and Gui Ren (people who will do something good to the clients) comes as a result of this yin and yang world view.

Date 
The period for villain hitting is different among temples, but Jingzhe is the most popular date. According to some folklore, Jingzhe is the date when the whole of creation is awakened by thunder. As a result, different kinds of foul spirits including baihu and villains become active. Consequently, villain hitting on this day serves to prevent those harmful to others.

Location 
Villain hitting is often done in gloomy places such as somewhere under an overpass. In Hong Kong, the Canal Road Flyover between Causeway Bay and Wan Chai is a popular place for villain hitting. To reach the destination, head to Causeway Bay MTR Exit A and walk along Russell Street for approximately 5 minutes towards Canal Road Flyover. There are many villain hitters and clients here especially on Jingzhe.

History in Hong Kong 
The tradition of villain hitting can be traced back to an ancient custom from agricultural societies in the Guangdong region. According to the Chinese calendar, the year can be divided into twenty-four solar terms and Spring is known as the "Awakening of Insects"- when hibernating animals awake from their slumber to forage and feed. In order to prevent the notorious white tiger from hunting and harming villagers, farmers will worship the white tiger by smearing pig's blood onto little paper tigers as a means of sacrifice and feeding the tiger. As time passed, "villains" gradually morphed into the role of the notorious white tiger and becomes the object of exorcisms and banishment.

Ceremony 

Receiving orders from clients, villain hitters require human-shaped papers with or without some information of specific people. As part of the ceremony, they beat the papers with shoes or other implements. The whole ceremony of villain hitting is divided into 8 parts:

 Sacrifice to divinities: Worship of deities by Incense and Candle.
 Report: Writing down the name and the date of birth of the client on the Fulu. If the client requests to hit a specific villain, then write down or put the name, date of birth, photo or clothings of the specific villain on the villain paper.
 Villain hitting: Make use of a varieties of symbolic object such as the shoe of clients or the villain hitter or other religious symbolic weapons like incense sticks to hit or hurt the villain paper. Villain paper can also be replaced by other derivatives such as man paper, woman paper, five ghost paper etc.
 Sacrifice to Bái Hǔ: The hitters have to make sacrifice to Bái Hǔ if they want to hit the villain on Jingzhe. Use a yellow paper tiger to represent Bái Hǔ, there are black stripes on the paper tiger and a pair of tooth shapes in its mouth. During the sacrifice a small piece of pork is soaked with pig blood and then put inside the mouth of the paper tiger (to feed Bái Hǔ). Bái Hǔ won't hurt others after being fed. Sometimes they will also smear a greasy pork on Bái Hǔ's mouth to make its mouth full of oil and unable to open its mouth to hurt people. In some regional sacrifice the villain hitter would burn the paper tiger or cut off its head after making sacrifice to it.
 Reconciliation
 Pray for blessings: Use a red Gui Ren paper to pray for blessings and help from Gui Ren.
 Treasure Burning: Burn the paper-made-treasure to worship the spirits.
 Zhi Jiao (or so-called "cup hitting" [打杯]): Zhi Jiao, to cast two crescent-shaped wooden pieces to undergo the Zhi Jiao ceremony.

See also 
 Lingnan culture
 Chinese spiritual world concepts

Notes

External links 

 Beating the Petty Person - Analysis by Chien Chiao - Live Curiously Magazine
 "Speaking on Jingzhi (驚螫之談)". Hong Kong Mystery Exploration Society. Retrieved 11 June 2006.
 Villain hitting report, by Chinese Civilization Centre, City University of Hong Kong. Retrieved 12 June 2006.
 Villain hitting中國文化中心
 古代詛咒術「打小人」
 解構打小人 文化廣場

The Hong Kong Agent a film by Robert Iolini. Watch episode "Pay-As-You-Go Shamanic Mobile Service Centre: Divine Intervention #3"

Culture of Hong Kong
Cantonese culture
Witchcraft in China
Ngo Keng Kiu